Timothy Sean Durkin (born December 9, 1981) is a Canadian film director, screenwriter and producer.  He won the Dramatic Directing Award at the 2011 Sundance Film Festival for Martha Marcy May Marlene.  His short film, Mary Last Seen, on the same theme as Martha, won the award for best short film at the 2010 Cannes Film Festival Directors' Fortnight. In 2013, Durkin directed the Channel 4 drama series Southcliffe, starring Sean Harris and Rory Kinnear. His second film, The Nest, premiered in 2020. He has begun production on his next film titled The Iron Claw, a biography based on the Von Erich family.

Life and career
Durkin was born in Canada and moved to England soon thereafter; he was raised in North London and in Surrey until his family moved to Manhattan when he was 12.  Durkin graduated from Kent School in Kent, Connecticut in 2000, then attended the film school at New York University, where he graduated in 2005 and delivered his thesis film in 2006. He moved to Williamsburg, Brooklyn in 2008.

In an interview with Robert K. Elder for the book The Best Film You've Never Seen, Durkin said, “When I make a film, I think about things that scare me. My exploration of those things is to try and wrap my head around them and confront them.”

Durkin participated in the 2012 Sight & Sound critics' poll, where he listed his ten favorite films as follows: 3 Women, The Birds, The Conformist, The Goonies, Jaws, The Panic in Needle Park, Persona, The Piano Teacher, Rosemary's Baby, and The Shining.

Durkin is a founding member of Borderline Films with fellow directors Antonio Campos and Josh Mond.

Filmography
Music videos
 "Air Traffic Control" by Louis XIV (2008)
 "Your Love Is Killing Me" by Sharon Van Etten (2014)

Short films

Feature films

Executive producer
 Two Gates of Sleep (2010)
 The Eyes of My Mother (2016)
 Christine (2016)
 Katie Says Goodbye (2016)
 Piercing (2018)
 The Rental (2020)

Television

References

External links

1981 births
Film producers from New York (state)
Kent School alumni
Living people
People from Williamsburg, Brooklyn
Film directors from New York City
Canadian film directors
21st-century Canadian screenwriters